The Tufton Hall Waterfall is located in St. Mark's parish, just outside Victoria, Grenada.  It is the tallest waterfall in Grenada, with the approximate height of 25 m.   The only way to visit the waterfall is to hike for approximately 3 hours (each way) through technical and somewhat strenuous terrain. Guides from Victoria are available, usually carrying rope and cutlass.

References

External links
 https://web.archive.org/web/20101231162600/http://www.grenadaexplorer.com/Waterfalls.htm

Landforms of Grenada
Waterfalls of North America